Christian G. Hanburger, Jr.  (born August 13, 1941) is an American former professional football player who was a linebacker in the National Football League (NFL). He played his entire 14-year career with the Washington Redskins, from 1965 through 1978, and was elected to the Pro Football Hall of Fame in 2011.

Early life and college career
After being a star end for the "Crabbers" at Hampton High School in Hampton, Virginia, Hanburger joined the United States Army.  He later accepted a scholarship from the University of North Carolina in Chapel Hill, where he played college football for the Tar Heels. From 1962 through 1964, Hanburger played on offense at center, as well as on defense, as a middle linebacker. He was All-Atlantic Coast Conference at center as both a junior and senior. In 1963, the Tar Heels won the Gator Bowl and a shared ACC Championship with NC State.

NFL career

Hanburger was selected by the Redskins in the 18th round (245th overall) of the 1965 NFL Draft. As a professional, he was considered one of the best outside linebackers of his era and was elected to the Pro Bowl nine times during his career, the most in Washington Redskin history. Hanburger earned the nickname "The Hangman" due to his penchant for clotheslining tackles. From 1973 to 1977, he called the Redskins' defensive signals and acted as the defensive quarterback for head coach George Allen.

Hanburger was a four-time first-team All-Pro (1972, 1973, 1975, 1976) and a second-team All-Pro in 1969 and 1974. Additionally, he was either a Pro Bowler or an All-Conference selection every year from 1966 through 1976 with the exception of 1971—receiving post-season honors in 10 of 11 seasons in that span. From 1971 to 1973, he and Jack Pardee, outside linebacker on the opposite side, formed a particularly effective tandem. In 1972, Hanburger was named the NFC Defensive Player of the Year by the Kansas City Committee of 101. That year, the Redskins won the NFC championship game of the NFL playoffs against the defending champion Dallas Cowboys, when they limited them to 3 points, 96 rushing yards, and 73 net passing yards with Roger Staubach at quarterback, Hanburger getting a sack. Though their defense allowed only 14 points, the Redskins lost Super Bowl VII to the undefeated Miami Dolphins.

Beginning with the 1968 season, Hanburger started 135 straight games, a streak that ended in 1977 after he underwent an appendicitis operation. In the Redskins' season finale of that season, he recorded three sacks against the Los Angeles Rams in a 17–14 win. He played in 1978 to finish his 14-year career. In his career, he picked off 19 passes, recovered 17 fumbles, recorded 46 sacks and scored five touchdowns, two on interception returns and three from fumble recoveries.  

In 2004, he was named to the Professional Football Researchers Association Hall of Very Good in the association's second HOVG class 

On August 25, 2010, Hanburger was nominated as a senior candidate for the Pro Football Hall of Fame Class of 2011 along with former Rams linebacker and kicker Les Richter. On February 5, 2011, Hanburger was officially inducted at the enshrinement ceremony where his bust, sculpted by Scott Myers, was unveiled.

References

External links

Pro Football Hall of Fame

1941 births
Living people
American football linebackers
North Carolina Tar Heels football players
Washington Redskins players
Eastern Conference Pro Bowl players
National Conference Pro Bowl players
Pro Football Hall of Fame inductees
Sportspeople from Hampton, Virginia
Players of American football from Virginia
People from Fort Bragg, North Carolina
Hampton High School (Virginia) alumni